Tezonapa is a municipality located in the high mountains region in the State of Veracruz, Mexico, about 219 km from state capital Xalapa. The law number 93 of December 22, 1960 San Agustín created Tezonapa's municipality with the congregations of the Josefinas, Prison, Tezonapa, Palmarito, etc.

Geographic limits

The municipality of Tezonapa is delimited to the north by Omealca and to the east and south by Puebla State. The region closed to town is watered by the San Jerónimo and Santiago rivers which are tributaries to the Tonto River, which in turn is a tributary to the Presa Miguel Aleman, better known as: La Presa de Temazcal linked to the Rio Papaloapan.

Agriculture

The region produces maize, beans, orange fruit, sugarcane and coffee. Sugarcane been the main agricultural product, second to coffee and followed by seasonal fruits, mango, papaya, banana, orange, mamey, etc...

Celebrations

In June the celebration in honor to Corpus Christy takes place and in December takes place the celebration in honor to La Virgen de Guadalupe, the locals do long "peregrinaciones" (pilgrimage) to La Basilica de Guadalupe in Mexico City and back.

Weather

The weather is hot and humid all year with rains in summer and autumn. During the months of late April to late May the dry season creates a hot and dry environment, followed by the storm season with an average rainfall of 2,000 millimeters.

Roads
Tezonapa is linked to Cordoba and Tierra Blanca by paved roads, although the Tezonapa - Vicente Camalote section is bad, most of the rest it is ok. From Tezonapa you can get to many towns in the mountains:
La Luisa, La Union, Laguna Chica, San Agustin, Posorrones, Palmarito, Las Josefinas, El Vado, etc... In Laguna Chica the roads part ways to La Raya Licona and Almilinga all the way to Tlacotepec de Diaz, Puebla.

Economy
Tezonapa is home to the Ingenio Azucarero Constancia S.A. de C.V. (Sugarcane Processing Plant) which provides much needed jobs to locals. La Zafra (Sugarcane harvest) which in turn provides hundreds of jobs to people living in towns spread across the region, both industries are the economic backbone of the entire region, followed by smaller jobs created by agriculture, construction, markets, etc...

Transportation
Autobuses del Palmar, with its headquarters in town, is the only company providing transportation services in the region, they have many destinations including:
Tierra Blanca, Cordoba, Tlacotepec de Diaz, Palmar, Las Josefinas, Monte Alto, Almilinga, El Triunfo, Colonia Vicente Guerrero, etc...covering many small towns in their routes.

References

External links 

  Municipal Official webpage
  Municipal Official Information

Municipalities of Veracruz